Salifu Mudasiru (born 1 April 1997) is a Ghanaian professional footballer who plays as midfielder for Saudi Professional League club Al-Batin, on loan from Asante Kotoko.

Club career 
In July 2019, Mudasiru signed a two-year contract with Kumasi Asante Kotoko. In December 2019, he won his first trophy with the club, after Asante Kotoko defeated their rivals Hearts of Oak by 2–1 victory in the President's Cup. He made his debut on 29 December 2019, starting in a central midfield role in an eventual 1–0 victory over Techiman Eleven Wonders. On 7 October 2021, he was named as the new second deputy club captain by manager Prosper Narteh Ogum following the departure of Felix Annan and Emmanuel Gyamfi.

On 7 January 2023, Mudasiru joined Saudi Arabian club Al-Batin on loan.

Personal life 
Mudasiru married Zainab Mohammed in Kumasi on Sunday, 5 September 2021. He is a devout Muslim and regards Ghanaian international Mubarak Wakaso and former Ghanaian footballer Sulley Muntari as his role models.

Honours 
Asante Kotoko

 Ghana Premier League: 2021–22
 President's Cup: 2019

References

External links 

 
 

Living people
1997 births
Ghanaian footballers
Association football midfielders
Asante Kotoko S.C. players
People from Tamale, Ghana
Ghanaian expatriate footballers
Ghanaian expatriate sportspeople in Moldova
Expatriate footballers in Moldova
Al Batin FC players
Saudi Professional League players
Expatriate footballers in Saudi Arabia
Ghanaian expatriate sportspeople in Saudi Arabia